The Northern Highway is a secondary highway in northern Victoria. Along with the M/A79 Calder Highway (Melbourne to Mildura) and the M/A39 Goulburn Valley Highway (Melbourne to Tocumwal), it provides primary arterial links in the region. In conjunction with the B280 McIvor Highway, the B75 Northern Highway provides an important link between Melbourne and Bendigo.

It runs from the M31 Hume Freeway south of Wallan to the New South Wales border at Echuca, on the banks of the Murray River, a distance of 166 kilometres. The highway traverses moderately hilly terrain from Wallan to Toolleen, then flat open country to the border at Echuca. Beyond Echuca across the NSW border, it continues as Cobb Highway.

The Northern Highway and the beginning of the McIvor Highway form a junction at Heathcote. The McIvor Highway leads to Bendigo and the Northern Highway continues to Echuca.

The B75 Northern Highway is a significant freight route providing access to markets, airport and port in Melbourne and the rural primary production areas of the Murray Valley and southern New South Wales. It serves a number of agricultural and tourism-related industries along its length.

History
The passing of the Highways and Vehicles Act of 1924 through the Parliament of Victoria provided for the declaration of State Highways, roads two-thirds financed by the State government through the Country Roads Board (later VicRoads). The Northern Highway was declared a State Highway on 1 July, 1925, cobbled from a collection of roads from Bendigo through Victoria (today the Midland Highway) and Rochester to Echuca (for a total of 55 miles); before this declaration, the road between Bendigo and Echuca was referred to as Bendigo-Echuca Road. In the 1947/48 financial year, it was rerouted south of Elmore: instead of running from Bendigo, another section between the Hume Highway at Kilmore via Heathcote to Elmore was added, along the former Heathcote-Elmore Road and Kilmore-Heathcote-Bendigo Roads; the previous alignment of the Northern Highway from Elmore to Bendigo was subsumed into the Midland Highway. The Northern Highway was extended south for the last time from Kilmore to Beveridge (just south of Wallan) along the former Hume Highway alignment, when the Kilmore bypass was opened in 1976.

The Northern Highway was later signed National Route 75 in 1955; with Victoria's conversion to the newer alphanumeric system in the late 1990s, this was updated to route B75.

The passing of the Road Management Act 2004 granted the responsibility of overall management and development of Victoria's major arterial roads to VicRoads: in 2007, VicRoads re-declared this road as Northern Highway (Arterial #6540), beginning in Echuca and ending in Beveridge.

Attractions
 Heathcote-Graytown National Park

See also

 Highways in Australia
 Highways in Victoria

References

Highways in Australia
Highways in Victoria (Australia)